Jervin Gian Benjamin (born 16 December 1994) is a Dominican cricketer. He made his first-class debut for the Windward Islands in the 2017–18 Regional Four Day Competition on 26 October 2017. He made his List A debut on 17 November 2019, for Combined Campuses and Colleges in the 2019–20 Regional Super50 tournament.

References

External links
 

1994 births
Living people
Dominica cricketers
Combined Campuses and Colleges cricketers
Windward Islands cricketers
Place of birth missing (living people)